Rock Your Face Off is the seventh and most recent studio album by the American rock band KIX. It is KIX's first studio release in 19 years since their 1995 album Show Business. It is Kix's first studio release with bassist Mark Schenker replacing the band's primary songwriter Donnie Purnell. Producer Taylor Rhodes co-wrote three of the album's songs, while former Funny Money guitarist Rob Galpin and Craig Stegall also get co-writing credits.

The album debuted at #48 on the Billboard Top 200, the second highest charting record ever for KIX next to 'Blow My Fuse'. It also debuted at #1 on the Amazon Rock chart and remained there for over four weeks.

Track listing

 Wheels in Motion                 (3:34) - (M. Schenker/R. Galpin/C. Stegall)
 You're Gone                      (4:25) - (Schenker/Galpin/Stegall/S. Whiteman)
 Can't Stop the Show              (4:38) - (Schenker/T. Rhodes)
 Rollin' in Honey                 (4:18) - (Schenker/Rhodes)
 Rock Your Face Off               (3:30) - (B. Forsythe/Schenker/Whiteman)
 All the Right Things             (4:04) - (Schenker/Forsythe)
 Dirty Girls                      (4:15) - (Whiteman/Forsythe)
 Inside Outside Inn               (4:04) - (Whiteman/Schenker/Galpin)
 Mean Miss Adventure              (3:36) - (Schenker/Galpin/Stegall)
 Love Me with Your Top Down       (3:44) - (Schenker/K. Scofield/Rhodes)
 Tail on the Wag                  (3:40) - (Whiteman/Forsythe)
 Rock & Roll Showdown            (3:47) - (Schenker/Galpin/Stegall/Whiteman)

Personnel 

Steve Whiteman – Lead Vocals, Harmonica
Ronnie "10-10" Younkins – Rhythm Guitar
Brian "Damage" Forsythe – Lead Guitar
Mark Schenker – Bass Guitar, Backing Vocals
Jimmy "Chocolate" Chalfant – Drums, Percussion, Backing Vocals

External links
Kix Official Website
Guitar.com 2014 interview with Kix guitarist Brian Forsythe

Kix (band) albums
2014 albums